Chen Ching-tsai (born 26 December 1952) is a Taiwanese politician. He was Deputy Secretary-General of the Executive Yuan from 2008 to 2014.

Education
Chen earned a master's degree in accounting from National Chengchi University in 1993 and an executive MBA from National Taiwan University in 2005.

Career
Chen was the accountant-general of the Ministry of Economic Affairs in 1999–2000. In 2000, he started to work for the Directorate-General of Budget, Accounting and Statistics, first as an accounting officer and chief secretary until 2003, then director-general of the First Bureau in 2003-2004 and deputy minister from 2004 to 2006. In 2008, he became Deputy Secretary-General of the Executive Yuan, remaining in this position until 2014.

References

1952 births
Living people
Government ministers of Taiwan
National Chengchi University alumni
National Taiwan University alumni